The rusty-fronted canastero (Asthenes ottonis) is a species of bird in the family Furnariidae. It is endemic to Peru.

Its natural habitats are subtropical or tropical moist montane forest and subtropical or tropical high-altitude shrubland.

References

rusty-fronted canastero
Birds of the Peruvian Andes
Endemic birds of Peru
rusty-fronted canastero
rusty-fronted canastero
Taxonomy articles created by Polbot